Tenderd is an analytics platform for efficient and sustainable fleet operations. It helps companies increase utilization of their capital equipment and vehicles, optimize logistics and maintenance, reduce fuel consumption during operations enabling project managers to monitor, reduce and offset carbon emissions all on the same platform.  

Using innovative IoT sensors and AI, Tenderd transforms equipment, vehicles or vessels to "smart" machines using equipment specific metrics to understand machines better.  

It has many of the largest E-commerce, Logistics, Energy and Construction companies on their client portfolio across the globe; helping them reduce their operational cost using actionable insights and intelligence using AI.  

The company is based in Dubai, United Arab Emirates and operates globally .

History
Tenderd was founded in May 2018 by Arjun Mohan after he moved back from the United States. 

In the summer of 2018, Tenderd was incubated at Y Combinator.

In June 2019, the company raised $5.8 million seed investment from international investors which include PayPal co-founder, Peter Thiel, and Y Combinator co-founder, Paul Graham.

In 2020, Tenderd launched its operation in Saudi Arabia.

Recognition
In April 2019, the World Economic Forum and the Bahrain Economic Development Board selected Tenderd as one of the “100 Arab start-ups shaping the Fourth Industrial Revolution”.

In November 2019, Tenderd won the Startup Pitch Competition organised by The Big 5.

In March 2020, Fast Company selected Tenderd as one of the Top 10 most innovative companies of 2020 in the Middle East for "building the largest heavy equipment rental marketplace in the Middle East".

In July 2020, received the Best Construction Technology Solutions UAE 2020 award by International Business Magazine.

In June 2021, won the Startup of the Year award by Construction Technology Festival (CTF). [10]

References

Construction equipment rental companies
Construction and civil engineering companies of the United Arab Emirates
Companies based in Dubai
Emirati companies established in 2018
Construction and civil engineering companies established in 2018
Y Combinator companies